The Maha Vir Chakra (MVC) is the second highest military decoration in India, after the Param Vir Chakra, and is awarded for acts of conspicuous gallantry in the presence of the enemy, whether on land, at sea or in the air. It replaced the British Distinguished Service Order (DSO). The medal may be awarded posthumously.

Appearance
The medal is made of standard silver and is circular in shape. Embossed on the obverse is a five pointed heraldic star with circular center-piece bearing the gilded state emblem of India in the center. The words "Mahavira Chakra" are embossed in Hindi and English on the reverse with two lotus flowers in the middle. The decoration is worn on the left chest with a half-white and half-orange riband about 3.2 cm in width, the orange being near the left shoulder.

History
More than 218 acts of bravery and selfless courage have been recognized since the inception of the medal. The most MVCs awarded in a single conflict was in the Indo-Pakistani War of 1971, when eleven were given to the Indian Air Force.

Bar to MVC
Provision was made for the award of a bar for a second award of the Maha Vir Chakra, the first two being awarded in 1965. To date, there are six known awards of a first bar: 

No second bars have been awarded. Award of the decoration carries with it the right to use MVC as a post-nominal abbreviation.

List of recipients 

The Mahavir Chakra awardees include:

References

External links
List of Awardees, Awards given on 26 January 2011, India
Writeups on Maha Vir Chakra winners
Official Citations, Photos of MVC Awardees of the Indian Air Force
Recipients of Mahavir Chakra from Indian Navy
Recipients of Mahavir Chakra from Indian Army

Military awards and decorations of India
Courage awards